The Nigeria Labour Congress (NLC) is an umbrella organization for trade unions in Nigeria.

History
The Nigerian Labour Congress was founded in December 1978, as a merger of four different organisations: the Nigeria Trade Union Congress (NTUC), Labour Unity Front (LUF), United Labour Congress (ULC) and Nigeria Workers' Council (NWC).  However, the recently-established Federal Military Government, led by Murtala Mohammed, refused to recognise the new organisation, and instead set up the Adebiyi Tribunal to investigate the activities of trade unions and their leaders.  The Tribunal reported in 1976 and claimed that all the existing trade union centres propagated Cold War ideologies, depended on funding from international union federations, and mismanaged funds.  This was used as a justification to ban all four centres, with M. O. Abiodun appointed as the administrator of trade unions.  He accepted the establishment of a new Nigeria Labour Congress, on the condition that the approximately 1,500 affiliated unions were restructured into 42 industrial unions, plus 19 unions representing senior staff.

In 1978, the Nigeria Labour Congress was established, with the 42 industrial unions affiliated.  It was to be the only legal trade union federation.  Its leadership included many of the leading figures from its four predecessors, with Wahab Goodluck becoming its founding president.

During its history, conflicts with the military regime twice led to the dissolution of the NLC's national organs, the first in 1988 under the military regime of General Ibrahim Babangida and the second in 1994, under the regime of General Sani Abacha. In 1996, the 42 affiliates of the NLC were merged into 29, by Act of Parliament. Under Nigeria's military governments, labour leaders were frequently arrested and union meetings disrupted. Following democratic reforms in the country, some of the anti-union regulations were abolished in January 1999. The same month Adams Oshiomhole was elected President of the reformed organisation.

In the early 2000s, conflict between the government and the NLC escalated due to the organisation's opposition to higher fuel prices. The price increases are the result of decisions by the Olusegun Obasanjo government to dramatically reduce subsidies and to deregulate the purchase and sale of fue The NLC has led several general strikes protesting the government's fuel price policy.

In September 2004, the NLC gave the federal government an ultimatum to reverse the decision to reintroduce the controversial fuel tax or face a nationwide protest strike. The strike threat was made despite the fact that a Federal High Court judgement in an earlier dispute had declared the organisation lacking legal power to call a general strike over government policies.

Following the announcement of the strike plans, the NLC claimed President Adams Oshiomhole was arrested October 9, 2004 at a protest at Nnamdi Azikiwe Airport. According to the organisation, Oshiomhole was "abducted by a team of operatives of the State Security Services (SSS) numbering over fifteen, who overpowered him, wrestled him to the ground and bundled him into a standby Peugeot 504 station wagon, which bore no licence plates." The State Security Services called the claim "sensational and inaccurate reporting", saying that the NLC president had a "misunderstanding" with field operatives, but that the matter was soon resolved. A presidential spokesperson claimed that Oshiomhole was only invited for a "chat" at the airport, no arrest having taken place.

In 2005, the law was changed to permit other trade union federation to receive government recognition, and also to permit senior staff unions to join the NLC.  In 2016, about 25 affiliates left to form the United Labour Congress, but they rejoined the NLC in 2020.  By the end of the year, it had 43 affiliates, which as of 2016 represented more than 4,000,000 members.

One of the strongest protest of the NLC can be traced to January 2012 during the President Goodluck Jonathan administration. The president and his economic team had argued that fuel subsidy payments was making the country lose billions of naira and it will save around "£4.2bn annually to invest in underperforming refineries that have forced Nigeria to import its own oil once it has been refined". The president said his government was no more interested in the payment of fuel subsidy to petroleum markerters. This will move fuel prices which was sold for N65 a litre with subsidy inclusive to around N141 which implies more than a hundred per cent increase.

The campaign for fuel subsidy removal was supported by the ministers in his cabinet and mostly chaired by the then finance minister/coordinating minister for economy Dr. Ngozi Okonjo Iweala. The government announced that fuel subsidy was going to be removed by January 2012 and this announcement was not welcomed by the Nigeria Labour Congress. Abdulwahed Omar, the then NLC president challenged the government that there will be wide spread mass protest in Nigeria if it continued with its plans to remove fuel subsdy. The NLC was able to rally other trade unions and civicl societies to support its planned protest. This challenge was marked by actions when the government moved on with the removal of payments for fuel subsidy. By 9 January 2012, massive protest erupted around Nigeria and in major cities including Lagos, Abuja, Port Harcourt and Kano. These protest crippled the economy as there was a total shutdown of the Nations different workforce and it lasted more than five working days. This led the then president Jonathan to announce on live TV that government will now subsidize fuel prices and reduce it to about  $2.75 (£1.80) a gallon. The protest was eventually suspended after this broadcast by the federal government.

Together with the Trade Union Congress of Nigeria, the NLC supported Peter Obi and the Labour Party in the 2023 Nigerian general election, a party the NLC started in 2002. This is the first time the union has expressed explicit support for a political party.

Women's wing
The National Women Commission is the national women's wing of NLC. It was created in 2003 to increase the participation of women in the affairs of the union. Beginning in 1983, demand for more recognition of working women led to the establishment of women's wing  in state capitals. Currently state branches of NLC have a women's committee and the chairperson of the committee is an automatic member of the administrative council of the state's NLC. On the national level, the head of the National Women Commission is automatically a Vice-President of NLC.The president of the National Women Commission is Comrade Rita Goyit. The women wing also engages in massive rallies and protest in support for women rights and against gender based violence against women.

Affiliates

Current affiliates
The following unions are affiliated to the NLC:

Former affiliates

Leadership

Presidents
1978: Wahab Goodluck
1979: Hassan Sunmonu
1984: Ali Chiroma
1988: Pascal Bafyau
1994: Post vacant
1999: Adams Oshiomhole
2007: Abdulwaheed Omar
2015: Ayuba Wabba
2023: Joe Ajaero

General Secretaries
1978: Aliyu Dangiwa
1986: Lasisi Osunde
1992: Post vacant
2001: John Odah
2014: Peter Ozo-Eson
2019: Emmanuel Ugboaja

See also

History of Nigeria
Economy of Nigeria

References

External links
NLC official home page
Nigerian Tribune: NLC holds 30th anniversary lecture

National federations of trade unions
Trade unions in Nigeria
International Trade Union Confederation
Trade unions established in 1978